The Battle of Higos Urco, near Chachapoyas in the Amazonas Region of Peru, was part of the Peruvian War of Independence. 

The battle began on 6 June 1821. It was joined by small pro-independence and pro-Spanish forces. The battle was part of the campaign which led to the proclamation of Peruvian independence on 28 July 1821.

References

Conflicts in 1821
Battles involving Spain